The Order of the Eagle of Zambia is the highest civil decoration of Zambia. Founded on 23 October 1965, it consists of four grades: Grand Commander (GCEZ), Grand Officer (GOEZ) Officer (OEZ) and Member (MEZ).

References

Civil awards and decorations
Orders, decorations, and medals of Zambia
1965 establishments in Zambia
Awards established in 1965